Studio Collection, released under the name of Studio Collection 2000–2012, is a box set of studio albums released by American rock band Linkin Park in 2013. The set consists of their first five studio albums and their 2002 remix album Reanimation, each one containing the main track list.

Track listing 
 Disc 1 - Hybrid Theory
 "Papercut" - 3:04
 "One Step Closer" - 2:35
 "With You" - 3:23
 "Points of Authority" - 3:20
 "Crawling" - 3:29
 "Runaway" - 3:03
 "By Myself" - 3:09
 "In the End" - 3:36
 "A Place for My Head" - 3:04
 "Forgotten" - 3:14
 "Cure for the Itch" - 2:37
 "Pushing Me Away" - 3:11

 Disc 2 - Meteora
 "Foreword" - 0:13
 "Don't Stay" - 3:07
 "Somewhere I Belong" - 3:33
 "Lying from You" - 2:55
 "Hit the Floor" - 2:44
 "Easier to Run" - 3:24
 "Faint" - 2:42
 "Figure.09" - 3:17
 "Breaking the Habit" - 3:16
 "From the Inside" - 2:55
 "Nobody's Listening" - 2:58
 "Session" - 2:24
 "Numb" - 3:07

 Disc 3 - Reanimation
 "Opening" - 1:07
 "Pts.OF.Athrty" - 3:45
 "Enth E ND" - 4:00
 "[Chali]" - 0:23
 "Frgt/10" - 3:32
 "P5hng Me A*wy" - 4:38
 "Plc.4 Mie Hæd" - 4:20
 "X-Ecutioner Style" - 1:49
 "H! Vltg3" - 3:30
 "[Riff Raff]" - 0:21
 "Wth>You" - 4:12
 "Ntr\Mssion" - 0:29
 "Ppr:Kut" - 3:26
 "Rnw@y" - 3:13
 "My<Dsmbr" - 4:17
 "[Stef]" - 0:10
 "By_Myslf" - 3:42
 "Kyur4 th Ich" - 2:32
 "1Stp Klosr" - 5:46
 "Krwlng" - 5:40

 Disc 4 - Minutes to Midnight
 "Wake" - 1:40
 "Given Up" - 3:09
 "Leave Out All the Rest" - 3:29
 "Bleed It Out" - 2:44
 "Shadow of the Day" - 4:49
 "What I've Done" - 3:25
 "Hands Held High" - 3:53
 "No More Sorrow" - 3:41
 "Valentine's Day" - 3:16
 "In Between" - 3:16
 "In Pieces" - 3:38
 "The Little Things Give You Away" - 6:23

 Disc 5 - A Thousand Suns
 "The Requiem" - 2:01
 "The Radiance" - 0:57
 "Burning in the Skies" - 4:13
 "Empty Spaces" - 0:18
 "When They Come for Me" - 4:55
 "Robot Boy" - 4:28
 "Jornada Del Muerto" - 1:34
 "Waiting for the End" - 3:51
 "Blackout" - 4:39
 "Wretches and Kings" - 4:15
 "Wisdom, Justice, and Love" - 1:38
 "Iridescent" - 4:56
 "Fallout" - 1:23
 "The Catalyst" - 5:39
 "The Messenger" - 3:01

 Disc 6 - Living Things
 "Lost in the Echo" - 3:25
 "In My Remains" - 3:20
 "Burn It Down" - 3:50
 "Lies Greed Misery" - 2:27
 "I'll Be Gone" - 3:31
 "Castle of Glass" - 3:25
 "Victimized" - 1:46
 "Roads Untraveled" - 3:49
 "Skin to Bone" - 2:48
 "Until It Breaks" - 3:43
 "Tinfoil" - 1:11
 "Powerless" - 3:44

Credits 
Linkin Park
 Chester Bennington – lead vocals (except on "Cure for the Itch", "Foreword", "Session", "Wake", "Hands Held High", "The Requiem", "The Radiance", "Empty Spaces", "When They Come for Me", "Wisdom, Justice, and Love" and "Fallout"); rhythm guitar (on "Shadow of the Day" and "Iridescent"); vocals (on "When They Come for Me"); beatbox (on "Points of Authority"); additional percussion (on "When They Come for Me" and "Blackout"); backing vocals (on "When They Come for Me" and "Lost in the Echo"); additional vocals (on "Hands Held High" and "In Between")
 Rob Bourdon – drums, percussion, backing vocals
 Brad Delson – lead guitar, bass guitar, and backing vocals; rhythm guitar (on "Burning in the Skies"); acoustic guitar (on "The Messenger" and "Castle of Glass"); additional percussion (on "When They Come for Me", "Blackout" and "The Catalyst"), megaphone (on "When They Come for Me")
 Dave "Phoenix" Farrell – bass guitar (except on "Hybrid Theory" tracks); backing vocals; additional keyboard (on "Blackout")
 Joe Hahn – turntables, samples, scratching, programming, backing vocals
 Mike Shinoda – lead and rap vocals; rhythm guitar (on "Crawling", "Pushing Me Away", "Somewhere I Belong", "Hit the Floor", "Easier to Run", "Faint", "From the Inside", "P5hng Me A*wy", "Wth>You", "Wake", "Given Up", "Bleed It Out", "What I've Done", "No More Sorrow", "Valentine's Day", "In Pieces", "The Little Things Give You Away", "Waiting for the End", "Lost in the Echo", "In My Remains", "Lies Greed Misery", "I'll Be Gone", "Castle of Glass", "Victimized", "Roads Untraveled" and "Powerless"); lead guitar (on "Burning in the Skies"); acoustic guitar (on "The Little Things Give You Away"); vocoder (on "The Requiem" and "Fallout"); beatbox (on "Points of Authority"); keyboard, piano, sampler, synthesizer

Disc 1 

Additional musicians
Ian Hornbeck – additional bass (on tracks 1, 9 and 10)
Scott Koziol – additional bass (on One Step Closer)
Mark Wakefield - former vocalist (credit given on tracks 6, 9 and 10)
The Dust Brothers – sequencing, samples (on track 3)

Artwork
Frank Maddocks – graphic design
James Minchin III – photography
Mike Shinoda – soldier drawing, line art sketches, drawings
Joe Hahn – line art sketches, drawings

Production
Don Gilmore – producer, engineering
Steve Sisco – Engineering
John Ewing Jr. – Additional engineering, Pro Tools
Matt Griffin – Engineering assistance
Andy Wallace – mixing
Brian Gardner – Audio mastering, digital editing

Management
Jeff Blue – A&R, executive producer
Natalie Preston & Arriana Murray – A&R Coordination
Michael Arfin – Booking agent for Artist Group
Michael Oppenhein & Jonathan Schwart – Business managers for Gudvi, Chapnik & Oppenhein 
Danny Hayes – Legal for Selverne, Mandelbaum and Mintz
Petter Standish – Marketing director
Rob Mcdermott – World representation for The Firm

Disc 2 

Additional musicians
 David Campbell – Strings arrangement on "Faint" and "Breaking the Habit"
 Joel Derouin, Charlie Bisharat, Alyssa Park, Sara Parkins, Michelle Richards, Mark Robertson –  Violins
 Evan Wilson, Bob Becker –  Violas
 Larry Corbett, Dan Smith –  Celli
 David Zasloff – shakuhachi flute on "Nobody's Listening"

Production
 Produced by Don Gilmore and Linkin Park
 Recorded by Don Gilmore
 EnrJohn Ewing Jr. – Engineer
 Fox Phelps – Assistant engineer
 Andy Wallace – Mixing at Soundtrack Studios, New York, NY
 Steve Sisco – Assisted mixing
 Brian "Big Bass" Gardner – Mastering, digital editing at Bernie Grundman Mastering

Management
 Tom Whalley & Jeff Blue – A&R 
 Marny Cameron – A&R coordination
 Peter Standish & Kevin Sakoda – Marketing directors 
 Worldwide representation: Rob McDermott for the Firm with Additional Servitude by Ryan Saullo, Ryan Demarti, and Noah Edelman
 Booking agent: Michael Arfin for Artist Group, International
 Danny Hayes – Legal for Davis, Shapiro, Lewit, Montone & Hayes
 Michael Oppenheim & Jonathan Schwartz – Business Managers for Gudvi, Sussman & Oppenheim
 Worldwide licensing and merchandising: Bandmerch

Artwork
 Mike Shinoda & The Flem – Creative direction
 The Flem – Art direction & design
 Delta, Mike Shinoda, Joseph Hahn & The Flem – Installation artists
 James R. Minchin III – Photography 
 Nick Spanos – Spray paint can close-up photos

Disc 3 

Production
 Don Gilmore - producer (original recordings)
 Andy Wallace - mixing (original recordings)
 Mike Shinoda - producer, art direction, design, art
 Mark "Spike" Stent - mixing
 David Treahearn - mixing assistant
 Paul "P-Dub" Walton - ProTools engineer
 Brian "Big Bass" Gardner - mastering, digital editing
 Nancie Stern - sample clearance
 Tom Whalley - A&R
 Kevin Sakoda -  A&R, marketing director
 Jeff Blue - A&R
 Natalie Preston - A&R coordination
 Peter Standish - marketing director
 Rob McDermott - worldwide representation
 Clay Patrick McBride - photography
 Flem - art direction, design
 Joseph Hahn - art

Additional musicians and interpretations
 Jay Gordon - interpretation on "Pts.OF.Athrty"
 Nova - programming, interpretation on "Pts.OF.Athrty"
 Doug Trantow - additional programming, additional producer, engineer on "Pts.OF.Athrty"
 KutMasta Kurt - interpretation on "Enth E Nd"
 Motion Man - vocals on "Enth E Nd"
 The Alchemist - interpretation on "Frgt/10"
 Chali 2na - vocals on "Frgt/10"
 Stephen Richards - vocals on "P5hng Me A*wy"
 AmpLive - interpretation on "Plc.4 Mie Hæd"
 Baba Zumbi - vocals on "Plc.4 Mie Hæd"
 Sean C - producer on "X-Ecutioner Style"
 Roc Raida - interpretation on "X-Ecutioner Style"
 Black Thought - vocals on "X-Ecutioner Style"
 Jeff Chestek - engineer on "X-Ecutioner Style"
 Ray Wilson - assistant engineer on "X-Ecutioner Style"
 Evidence - interpretation on "H! Vltg3"
 Pharoahe Monch - vocals on "H! Vltg3"
 DJ Babu - cut on "H! Vltg3"
 Porse 1 - additional production on "H! Vltg3"
 DJ Revolution - editing on "H! Vltg3"
 Troy Staton - mixing on "H! Vltg3"
 Aceyalone - vocals on "Wth>You"
 Cheapshot - interpretation on "Ppr:Kut"
 Jubacca (Vin Skully) - interpretation on "Ppr:Kut"
 Rasco - vocals on "Ppr:Kut"
 Planet Asia - vocals on "Ppr:Kut"
 Josh Kouzomis - interpretation on "Rnw@y"
 E.Moss - interpretation on "Rnw@y"
 Phoenix Orion - vocals on "Rnw@y"
 Mickey Petralia - additional production on "Rnw@y"; keyboards, programming, producer, interpretation on "My<Dsmbr"
 Michael Fitzpatrick - programming, interpretation on "My<Dsmbr"
 Kelli Ali - vocals on "My<Dsmbr"
 Greg Kurstin - keyboards on "My<Dsmbr"
 Josh Abraham - interpretation on "By_Myslf"
 Stephen Carpenter - guitar on "By_Myslf"
 Ryan Williams - engineer on "By_Myslf"
 Jonas G. - engineer on "By_Myslf"
 Erik Gregory - programming on "By_Myslf"
 The Humble Brothers - interpretation on "1stp Klosr"
 Jonathan Davis - vocals on "1stp Klosr"
 Aaron Lewis - vocals on "Krwlng"

Disc 4 

Production
 Rick Rubin – production
 Dana Nielsen, Andrew Scheps and Ethan Mates – engineering
 Phillip Broussard Jr. – engineer assisting
 Neal Avron – mixing
 Nicolas Fournier and George Gumbs – mixing assisting
 Dave Collins – mastering

Guest musicians on tracks 3, 5, 7 and 12
 David Campbell – string arrangements and conducting
 Charlie Bisharat – violin
 Mario DeLeon – violin
 Armen Garabedian – violin
 Julian Hallmark – violin
 Gerry Hilera – violin
 Songa Lee-Kitto – violin
 Natalie Leggett – violin
 Josefina Vergara – violin
 Sara Parkins – violin
 Matt Funes – viola
 Andrew Picken – viola
 Larry Corbett – cello
 Suzie Katayama – cello
 Oscar Hidalgo – bass

Disc 5 
Production
 Rick Rubin – producer
 Mike Shinoda – producer, engineer, creative director, Pro Tools
 Neal Avron – mixing
 Kymm Britton – publicity
 Anton Brooks – publicity
 Lindsay Chase – production coordination
 Brad Delson – Pro Tools
 Ryan DeMarti – production coordination, A&R
 Nicolas Fournier – assistant
 Joe Hahn – creative director
 Jerry Johnson – drum technician
 Liza Joseph – A&R
 Frank Maddocks – art direction, design, creative director
 Ethan Mates – engineer, Pro Tools
 Vlado Meller – mastering
 Josh Newell – engineer, Pro Tools
 Czeslaw "NoBraiN" Sakowski – programming
 Mark Santangelo – assistant
 Peter Standish – marketing
 Josh Vanover – artwork, creative director
 Ellen Wakayama – creative director
 Tom Whalley – A&R

Disc 6 
Additional musicians
 Owen Pallett – strings on "I'll Be Gone"

Technical personnel
 Rick Rubin – producer
 Mike Shinoda – producer, engineer, creative director
 Joe Hahn – creative director
 Ethan Mates – engineer
 Andrew Hayes – assistant, engineer, editor
 Brad Delson – additional production
 Jerry Johnson – drum technician
 Ryan DeMarti – production coordination, A&R coordination
 Manny Marroquin – mixing (assisted by Chris Galland and Del Bowers)
 Brian Gardner – mastering
 Rob Cavallo – A&R
 Liza Jospeph – A&R coordination
 Peter Standish – marketing director
 Brandon Parvini – artwork, creative director
 The Uprising Creative – art direction, design
 Frank Maddocks – LP icon design

Source: AllMusic.

Charts

References 

Albums produced by Rick Rubin
Linkin Park albums
2013 compilation albums
Warner Records compilation albums